Karlag (Karaganda Corrective Labor Camp, Russian: Карагандинский исправительно-трудовой лагерь, Карлаг) was one of the largest Gulag labor camps, located in Karaganda Oblast (now Karaganda Region, Kazakhstan), Kazakh SSR, USSR. It was established in 1931 during the period of settlement of remote areas of greater USSR and its ethnic republics. Cheap labor was in high demand for these purposes. People were arrested and transported from west of the Ural Mountains to the gigantic labor camp in central Kazakhstan spanning from Akmola Region in the north to the Chu River in the south. Later, after WWII, another wave of prisoners poured in, constituting Soviet former POWs held captive by the Nazis before the Red Army returned them to the Soviet Union. Many Karlag inmates were prisoners sentenced as "enemies of the people" under Article 58 RSFSR. Over 1,000,000 inmates  in total served in Karlag over its history.

One of the main reasons for creating Karlag camp was the establishment of a large agricultural base supported by free labor for rapidly growing industry in central Kazakhstan - Karaganda Coal Basin in particular. The camp was founded on uninhabited empty steppe and grew fairly quickly within the first couple of years with the help of neighboring regions of the north and south. As Karlag territory expanded, it absorbed some civilian settlements which included ethnic Russians, Ukrainians and Germans who had moved to the area between 1906-1907. As a result, in 1931 those civilian settlements were forced to relocate by NKVD forces. Collectivization of the steppe, forced relocation, and confiscation pushed them to the city of Karaganda and its neighboring regions. Karaganda was just starting to build coal mines, so many of these resettled people were used as cheap labor. Confiscated sheep, camels, cattle, and horses were transported to the newly formed "Eastern Meats" (Vostok Myaso) organization, which processed it in order to feed the labor force.
The empty lands of resettled people were soon filled with thousands of rows of inmates. Echelons of new prisoners came one after another from the central parts of the Russian SFSR. They quickly spread across the steppe building railroads, housing for livestock, housing for camp employees, barracks, and isolation units.

Karlag wardens answered only to Gulag NKVD in Moscow. No Soviet, state or local government organizations had any influence on the operations of the wardens and supervisors of the camp. It resembled a colony, with a heavy management apparatus. Its departments included: administrative-agricultural, planning and control, culture-educational, human resources, trade, supply-chain, transport, finance, political, medical, and more. In Karlag, the inmates' efforts built a meat-processing plant and a leather/fur-processing plant which produced leather products, furs and valenki.

In 2020 in Zhanalyk village (Rus. Жаналык) local farmers excavated remains of at least 55 victims of NKVD executions.

Notable inmates

Arkadiy Belinkov (1921–1970), writer
Alexander Grigoriev (1891–1961), painter
Nikolay Urvantsev (1893–1985), geologist and explorer
Alexander Chizhevsky (1897–1964), scientist
Margarete Buber-Neuman (1901–1989), German writer
Aleksandr Solzhenitsyn (1918–2008), author and critic of the Gulag system
Mikulas Gacek (1895–1970), writer
Vasile Pop (1921-2009), engineer

References

Camps of the Gulag
Karaganda Region
Kazakh Soviet Socialist Republic